Sound check, Sound Check, or soundcheck may refer to:

Soundcheck, the preparation that takes place before a concert
Soundcheck (Leslie West album), a 2015 album
Soundcheck (radio program), a talk radio program about music and the arts
Soundcheck (song), a 2016 single by Welsh indie band Catfish and the Bottlemen
Sound Check (iTunes feature), a volume normalization system in iTunes

See also
Mr. Shovel's Check One Two
Mic check (phrase)